Phạm Hải Nam (born February 21, 1983) is a Vietnamese footballer who is a defender for Hà Nội.

External links 

1983 births
Living people
Vietnamese footballers
Association football defenders
Vietnam international footballers